Pterostylis abrupta, commonly known as the tablelands greenhood, is a species of orchid endemic to New South Wales. It is distinguished from similar greenhood orchids by its thick, flat, platform-like sinus and blunt labellum which is only just visible above the sinus.

Description
The flowers are dark green, white and brown. Flowering occurs from December to April.

Taxonomy and naming 
Pterostylis abrupta was first formally described in 1985 by David Jones and the description was published in The Orchadian. The specific epithet (abrupta) is a Latin word meaning "precipitous" or "steep".

Distribution and habitat
The tablelands greenhood grows on ridges and slopes among rocks and grass in rich soil on the higher parts of the ranges and tablelands of New South Wales north from Barrington Tops.

Use in horticulture
This greenhood is easily grows in pots although plants must be kept moist during the growing season and dry when dormant.

References

abrupta
Endemic orchids of Australia
Orchids of New South Wales
Plants described in 1985